Rod Osterlund was a NASCAR Winston Cup Series car owner spanning from 1977–1981, and then again from 1989–1991. He earned his money off rental property in California. Osterlund's first race as a car owner was at the 1977 Cam 2 Motor Oil 400 while his final race as a car owner was at the 1991 Daytona 500.

In 2010, Osterlund was inducted into the West Coast Stock Car Hall of Fame.

Team history
Rod Osterlund started his first team in 1977. In 1979 he hired rookie Dale Earnhardt, who went on to win Rookie of the Year, and then the championship in 1980. Osterlund sold this team to Jim Stacy in the middle of the 1981 season. Earnhardt drove four races for Stacy before he left for Richard Childress Racing.

Drivers
Osterlund fielded cars for drivers from which Earnhardt won Osterlund his only Winston Cup Championship in 1980. Other notable drivers include Neil Bonnett in 1977, Dave Marcis in 1978, David Pearson subbing in for an injured Dale Earnhardt in 1979, Hut Stricklin in 1989, and Jimmy Spencer in 1990. As of 2009 he lives in California.

Statistics
Osterlund as a car owner had 201 starts, 7 wins, 59 top 5 finishes, 91 top 10 finishes, 5 poles, and the 1980 Winston Cup points championship.

References

External links
 Rod Osterlund

NASCAR team owners
Living people
Year of birth missing (living people)